Traps n’ Gemstones is a mobile game developed by Swedish indie studio Donut Games and published on July 23, 2014. It is available on iOS and Android.

Reception
The game has a rating of 93% on Metacritic based on 6 critic reviews.

Grab It Magazine said "Known for its short and sweet bite-sized gems, Donut Games has reinvented itself. This perfect blend of Metroidvania exploration and Indiana Jones like action makes for the ultimate long black: perhaps we’ve seen the last of Donut’s expressos." TouchArcade wrote "Traps n' Gemstones could probably benefit from a little more flash and razzle-dazzle, and a few bosses wouldn't hurt, but I'm not going to gripe too much when what's here is as good as it is. " Gamezebo wrote "Traps n' Gemstones could probably benefit from a little more flash and razzle-dazzle, and a few bosses wouldn't hurt, but I'm not going to gripe too much when what's here is as good as it is. " Gamezebo said "An ambitious yet inviting freeform platform-adventure that strikes the perfect balance between depth and accessibility. " Multiplayer.it said "Traps n’ Gemstones is a fun and compelling metroidvania kind of game, suited for both newcomers and veterans of the genre. " 148apps wrote "Fight mummies, dig tunnels, and ride a runaway minecart to discover ancient secrets in this throwback exploration game. "

References

2014 video games
Android (operating system) games
Platform games
IOS games
Video games developed in Sweden